Mitromorpha crassilirata is a species of sea snail, a marine gastropod mollusk in the family Mitromorphidae.

Description
The length of the shell attains 4.5 mm, its diameter 1.7 mm.

(Original description) The shell is slightly longer than Mitromorpha paucilirata and more solid, with the same number of spirals, but these are much stouter, the infrasutural cord being specially round and conspicuous.

Distribution
This marine species is endemic to Australia and occurs off South Australia.

References

External links
 

crassilirata
Gastropods described in 1909
Gastropods of Australia